Meitei Sankirtan, also known as Meitei Sankirtana or Manipuri Sankirtan or Manipuri Sankirtana, is a Meitei cultural form of performing art involving ritual singing, drumming and dancing performed in the temples and domestic spaces in Manipur in India. Through the performances which exhibit unparalleled religious devotion and energy, the performers narrate the many stories of Krishna often moving the spectators to tears. It is practiced primarily by the Meitei Hindus (primarily Vaishnavas) in Manipur and by the Vaishnava Manipuri population settled in the neighbouring States of Tripura and Assam. "Sankirtana: Ritual singing, drumming and dancing of Manipur" was inscribed on the Representative List of the UNESCO Intangible Cultural Heritage of Humanity during the eighth session of the UNESCO Intergovernmental Committee meeting in Baku, Azerbaijan, held in December 2013.

An outline of the performance
The Nomination file for Inscription on the Representative List of the Intangible Cultural Heritage of Humanity prepared by Sangeet Natak Akademi  describes this performing art thus:

References

External links
A video on Sankirtana, ritual singing, drumming and dancing of Manipur, prepared by Sangeet Natak Akademi, India, and published by UNESCO (duration 9 minutes 57 seconds): Sankirtana

Culture of Manipur
Dance in India
Meitei culture